The 2018–19 Elon Phoenix women's basketball team represents Elon University during the 2018–19 NCAA Division I women's basketball season. The Phoenix, led by eighth year head coach Charlotte Smith, play their home games at the brand new Schar Center and were members of the Colonial Athletic Association (CAA). They finished the season 9–21, 4–14 in CAA play to finish in eighth place. They lost in the first round of the CAA women's tournament to Hofstra.

Roster

Schedule

|-
!colspan=9 style=| Exhibition

|-
!colspan=9 style=| Non-conference regular season

|-
!colspan=9 style=| CAA regular season

|-
!colspan=9 style=| CAA Women's Tournament

See also 
2018–19 Elon Phoenix men's basketball team

References 

Elon Phoenix women's basketball seasons
Elon